Hattori Tadasaburō (服部唯三郎) was a Japanese cloisonné artist from Nagoya.

Many of his works are held in collections such as the Victoria & Albert Museum and the Khalili Collection of Japanese Art.

See also 
 Ando Jubei
 Namikawa Yasuyuki

References

External links 

 Kagedo Gallery | Hattori Tadasaburo

Japanese enamellers
People from Nagoya
Year of birth missing
Year of death missing